William Cooper (1826–1871) was an English accountant. He is best known for having founded the accountancy practice of Cooper Brothers that now forms part of PricewaterhouseCoopers.

Career
He was the son of Emmanuel Cooper, an important figure in the City of London and Deputy Chairman of London & County Bank.

He first started his professional career as a clerk in the firm of Quilter, Ball & Co. In 1854 he left that firm to work on his own at 13 George Street in London. In 1858 he changed the name of the firm to W. & A. Cooper when his brother, Arthur, joined his practice and in 1860 to Cooper Brothers - a name that is now famous.

References

1826 births
1871 deaths
English accountants
PricewaterhouseCoopers
19th-century English businesspeople